Sid Burrows (born 27 October 1964 in Belfast) is a retired footballer from Northern Ireland who played as a left winger.

Sid began his senior career with Crusaders, before joining Linfield in October 1986. He scored 27 goals in 184 games for Linfield, before he was surprisingly sold to old club Crusaders in 1991, remaining there as captain until 1997 when a cruciate knee ligament injury sustained against Cliftonville ended his career. He coached Crusaders Reserves after his retirement. He was inducted into Crusaders Hall of Fame in 2010.

Now living in Portadown, Burrows is a coach at intermediate club Laurelvale. A Christian, he is also an Assistant Pastor in the Pentecostal Church.

Honours
Crusaders
Irish League (2): 1994–95, 1996–97
Irish League Cup (1): 1996–97
Gold Cup (2): 1985–86, 1995–96
Ulster Cup (1): 1993–94
County Antrim Shield (1): 1991–92

Linfield
Irish League (2): 1986–87, 1988–89
Irish League Cup (1): 1986–87
Gold Cup (3): 1987–88, 1988–89, 1989–90

References

Association footballers from Northern Ireland
Crusaders F.C. players
Living people
1964 births
Association football wingers